Jean-Noël Ribot (born 26 December 1949) is a French rower. He competed at the 1972 Summer Olympics and the 1976 Summer Olympics.

References

1949 births
Living people
French male rowers
Olympic rowers of France
Rowers at the 1972 Summer Olympics
Rowers at the 1976 Summer Olympics
Place of birth missing (living people)